Mohamed Jameel (born 4 October 1975) is a Maldivian footballer nicknamed "Jambey", who plays as a defender for New Radiant. He was a member of the Maldives national football team. He is from the island of Eydhafushi, Baa Atoll.

International career
Though he started playing for the national team from the year 2000, he became a regular starting player from 2001. His last match was against India in the 2011 SAFF Championship semi-final.

International goals

Awards and honours

Club
Valencia
Dhivehi League (4): 2001, 2002, 2003, 2008
President's Cup (1): 2008
FA Charity Shield (1): 2009
POMIS Cup (2): 2001, 2003

New Radiant
Dhivehi League (1): 2006
FA Cup (2): 2005, 2006

Victory
FA Cup (1): 2010

VB Addu FC
FA Charity Shield (1): 2012

International
Maldives
SAFF Championship: 2008; runner-up: 2003, 2009

References

External links

Sports Blog

1975 births
Living people
Maldivian footballers
Maldives international footballers
Club Valencia players
New Radiant S.C. players
Victory Sports Club players
Association football defenders